William Amos Hough High School is a high school in Cornelius, North Carolina, a northern suburb of Charlotte.  The school opened in 2010.

Hough's boundary includes: Cornelius, Davidson, and a section of Huntersville.

History
The school was constructed to relieve crowding at North Mecklenburg High School. It is named in honor of William Amos Hough, principal of North Meck High School from 1955 to 1974.

Athletics
Hough's athletic teams are known as the "Huskies". The school is a part of the North Carolina High School Athletic Association (NCHSAA) and competes in the I-Meck 4A athletic conference.

Extracurricular activities
The school has a National STEM league team, named "Iditarod Motorsports".

Performing arts
Hough has a marching band known as the Husky Marching Band, and Hough has a competitive show choir, "Howlin' Huskies". The Huskies claimed state championships in 2017 and 2018.

Notable alumni
 Erika Brown, Olympic swimmer
 Mark Fields, football player
 Luke Maye, basketball player
 Elliot Panicco, soccer player
 Van Smith, football player
 Daniel Steedman, soccer player

References

Schools in Mecklenburg County, North Carolina
Public high schools in North Carolina
Educational institutions established in 2010
2010 establishments in North Carolina